Troy A. McKenzie is a professor at the New York University School of Law. On April 29, 2022, NYU announced that he would become the dean of the School of Law, effective June 1, 2022.

Biography

In 1997, McKenzie graduated with a Bachelor of Science in chemical engineering from Princeton University. He went on to receive his Juris Doctor from New York University School of Law, graduating magna cum laude in 2000 after serving as an executive editor of the Law Review.

After law school, McKenzie clerked for Judge Pierre Leval of the United States Court of Appeals for the Second Circuit, and then for Justice John Paul Stevens of the United States Supreme Court.

In 2007, he joined the faculty at NYU School of Law. His scholarship focuses on civil procedure, bankruptcy law, complex litigation, the federal courts, and class actions.

McKenzie returned to NYU Law in 2017 after serving for two years as the Deputy Assistant Attorney General in the Office of Legal Counsel.

In 2019, McKenzie was the Ropes & Gray Visiting Professor of Law at Harvard Law School. He taught courses on civil procedure and the workings of the U.S. Supreme Court.

He is a member of both the American Law Institute and the American Bankruptcy Institute.

On April 29, 2022, NYU announced that McKenzie would become the dean of the School of Law, effective June 1, 2022.

Selected publications

 "'Helpless' Groups," 81 Fordham L. Rev. 3213 (2013)
 "Getting to the Core of Stern v. Marshall: History, Expertise, and the Separation of Powers," 86 Am. Bankr. L.J. 23 (2012)
 "The Mass Tort Bankruptcy: A Pre-History," 5 J. Tort L. 59 (2012)
 "Toward a Bankruptcy Model for Non-Class Aggregate Litigation," 87 N.Y.U. L. Rev. 960 (2012)

See also 

 List of law clerks of the Supreme Court of the United States (Seat 4)

References

External links
Profile at New York University

Living people
American jurists
Law clerks of the Supreme Court of the United States
New York University faculty
New York University School of Law faculty
Lawyers from New York City
American legal writers
21st-century American lawyers
New York University School of Law alumni
Year of birth missing (living people)